Benjamin Franklin Bomar (August 9, 1816 – February 1, 1868) was the second mayor of Atlanta, Georgia.

Bomar was born in Spartanburg, South Carolina, to Reverend Thomas Bomar and Elizabeth Carlton High and studied medicine in Charleston. He practiced medicine in America's first gold rush town of Dahlonega, Georgia, for a number of years until he tired of the winters in the Appalachian Mountains. He heard good things about Texas from his brother, Gen. Alexander Carlton Bomar who was serving in the Mexican–American War, and decided to move his family there. En route to Texas with his wife Sarah Elizabeth Lumpkin Haynes of Cumming, Georgia, and two children, Bomar arrived in Atlanta on April 30, 1847, fell in love with the bustling young town and settled there, running a general merchandise business on Whitehall Street.

The young town soon thereafter received its first charter, and elections were held December 1847. Moses Formwalt was made mayor, Bomar its alderman, and five others were elected councilmen, all for one-year terms. The next year, Bomar was elected mayor at the age of 32, as a member of the Free and Rowdy Party. During his term he selected and purchased six acres (24,000 m2) at $75 per acre to serve as the new Oakland Cemetery.

In 1849, while serving as mayor, Bomar co-founded Atlanta's first successful newspaper, the Daily Intelligencer.

He never practiced medicine regularly again. When Fulton County was formed as Atlanta's new home in 1854, he became the first clerk of its Superior Court which he remained as late as 1859, when his residence was on the Marietta road a mile outside of town (roughly where Howell Mill Road splits off today).

Benjamin Bomar was 44 years old at the outbreak of the American Civil War. He volunteered and served as the paymaster of Georgia's 28th Infantry, at a rank of captain. At the evacuation of the city following the Battle of Atlanta, his family refugeed to Macon, Georgia. After Lee's surrender, he rejoined the family in Atlanta; but by then his health was broken and he died less than three years later.

He was buried at Oakland Cemetery.

References

Mayors of Atlanta
1816 births
1868 deaths
People of Georgia (U.S. state) in the American Civil War
19th-century American politicians
Burials at Oakland Cemetery (Atlanta)